The following lists events that happened during 1796 in Australia.

Leaders
Monarch - George III
Governor of New South Wales – John Hunter
Lieutenant-Governor of Norfolk Island – Philip Gidley King
 Inspector of Public Works – John Macarthur/Richard Atkins

Events

 16 January – Australia's first theatre opens in Sydney. Edward Young's The Revenge and the comedy The Hotel are the first works performed.
 23 January – The distillation of spirits is prohibited.
 5 February – Soldiers from the New South Wales Corps wreck a house belonging to millwright John Baughan.
 10 February – Magistrate William Balmain challenges Macarthur over the house-wrecking incident.
 29 February – Macarthur resigns as Inspector of the Public Works and is replaced by Richard Atkins.
 June – George Bass makes an unsuccessful attempt to cross the Blue Mountains. Coal is discovered near Port Stephens.
 14 September – Governor Hunter complains to the Colonial Secretary of Macarthur's behaviour.
 15 September – Macarthur complains to Colonial Secretary of Hunter's governing.
 9 November – As Sydney grows, Hunter disbands the convict night watch. He divides Sydney into four districts responsible for their own watchmen and orders houses to be numbered.

Births
20 March – Edward Gibbon Wakefield
 date unknown
 Henry Vincent, first superintendent of Rottnest Island Aboriginal Prison (d. 1869)

References

 
Australia
Years of the 18th century in Australia